Umri is a city and taluka in Nanded subdivision of Nanded district of Maharashtra in India.

References

Cities and towns in Nanded district
Talukas in Maharashtra